Rocket Thrower is a 1963 bronze sculpture by American sculptor Donald De Lue. Created for the 1964 New York World's Fair, it is located in Flushing Meadows–Corona Park in Queens, New York City. De Lue was among a total of five sculptors who would create pieces for the fairground. He was contracted in 1962 for the amount of $105,000 with a deadline for completion of under six months. De Lue completed a full plaster model in 1963 at which time it was sent to Italy to be cast.

Description
His left hand is raised skyward and reaches for a swirl of stars which encircle the path of the rocket. Rocket Thrower left leg strains and crouches with his left foot planted on an arched perch. His right leg extends out fluidly. On the front of the perch (facing the Unisphere) are three distinct stars arranged in an angled line across its short width.

Over time the statue has been affected by corrosion, and its structural integrity has diminished. One arm was repaired in 1989. The statue was significantly restored in 2013.

The structure's location is East of Unisphere in the Hall of Astronauts.

Reception
When released, the critics of the time had mixed reviews of the work. De Lue explained the work as "the spiritual concept of man’s relationship to space and his venturesome spirit backed up by all the powers of his intelligence for the exploration of a new dimension." However, The New York Times art critic John Canaday described it as "the most lamentable monster, making Walt Disney look like Leonardo Da Vinci."

Gallery

See also
 Outdoor sculpture in New York City

References

External links
 
 Funds to Repair 

1963 sculptures
1964 New York World's Fair
Bronze sculptures in New York City
Buildings and structures in Queens, New York
Flushing Meadows–Corona Park
Nude sculptures in New York (state)
Outdoor sculptures in New York City
Rocket sculptures
Sculptures of men in New York City
Statues in New York City
New York Hall of Science